Andar ng mga Balita was a newscast of FM station Radyo5 92.3 News FM in Mega Manila, Philippines. Anchored by Martin Andanar, the newscast aired from Monday to Friday from 4:00 a.m. to 5:00 a.m., with television simulcast on AksyonTV.

Launched on November 8, 2010, Andar ng mga Balita was the first ever program to be aired over Radyo5 92.3 News FM. On February 21, 2011, it started its TV simulcast on AksyonTV and became the first ever program to be aired there. This was also the first radio program hosted by Martin Andanar. It made its final broadcast day on August 10, 2012 to make way for the new program entitled Manila sa Umaga, hosted by Arnell Ignacio. Andanar then joined Erwin Tulfo on Punto Asintado, which aired from 8:00 to 10:00 am.

Its TV newscast, however, aired weekdays as a nightly newscast and later as a noontime newscast on AksyonTV from 2011 to 2014.

Anchors
Martin Andanar
Mylene Valencia - Metro and regional news anchor
Sugar Sallador - World news anchor
Atty. Mike Templo - alternate World news anchor
Benjie "Tsongkibenj" Felipe - ShowBilis! at Andar ni Tsongki Benj anchor

Segments
Headlines Ngayon - Top Stories of the day
Headlines Noon - History
Sports - Sports News
ShowBilis at Andar ni Tsongki Benj (Mabilis na Andar ng mga Balitang Showbiz) - Showbiz News
Weather - Weather Forecast
MP3 (Mula Plaka hanggang MP3) - Music from LP to MP3
Police Reports - roundup of the latest police reports
''Andar Tanod Agents 005 - different barangay "tanod" will give reports about their community over the night. 

News5 shows
Philippine radio programs
2010 radio programme debuts
2012 radio programme endings